The Wright Eclipse is a low-floor single-deck bus body that was built by Wrightbus between 1999 and 2019. The second-generation Eclipse 2 was launched in 2008, followed by the third-generation Eclipse 3 in 2015. The Eclipse, and its sister design the Solar, were named for a solar eclipse which was visible in the UK in 1999, the year of its introduction.

The Eclipse was launched in 1999 on Volvo B7L chassis and, in 2003, the body was made available on the more popular Volvo B7RLE chassis. A coach version, the Eclipse SchoolRun, was later launched on high floor Volvo B7R chassis. In November 2008, Wright unveiled the Eclipse 2 at that year's Euro Bus Expo, with front and rear ends facelifted to match the Wright StreetCar. In 2015, the Eclipse 3 was launched on Volvo B8RLE chassis, the successor to the B7RLE. Production of the Eclipse has been suspended as Wrightbus entered administration in September 2019.

Over 2,100 Eclipses were built, with FirstGroup the largest customer. A double-decker version of the Eclipse is also available, known as the Wright Eclipse Gemini, and formerly also an articulated version, the Wright Eclipse Fusion.

First generation (1999–2011) 
The first generation Wright Eclipse was launched in 1999 by Wrightbus on Volvo B7L chassis as the replacement for the Wright Renown bodywork on the older Volvo B10BLE chassis. Of the 259 built, 196 were purchased by FirstGroup. Both a bi-axle and tri-axle variant were offered, however only the former was ever built.

However, sales of the B7L were lower than anticipated in the United Kingdom, owing to its unusual engine layout; as a result, the Eclipse Urban was launched on Volvo B7RLE chassis in 2003, at which time the original B7L bodywork was renamed to the Eclipse Metro. The Eclipse Urban proved to be far more successful in terms of sales and remained in production until 2011, while the Eclipse Metro was withdrawn from sale several years after introduction of the Eclipse Urban.

The bodywork of the Wright Eclipse and other Wrightbus products during the 2000s has become iconic, and has been used in publicity by both bus companies and local authorities.

Eclipse Commuter 
Wrightbus also offered the Eclipse Commuter for a time, which was built on a version of the B7RLE chassis with the higher floor section extended to the front axle of the bus. It was intended for longer distance and intercity work. The design included all of the features of a standard coach, such as under-floor storage and a high seating position, while maintaining a small low floor section for passengers in wheelchairs. The first entered service with Ulsterbus in April 2004 while Yorkshire Coastliner ordered six (which never entered service) and Stagecoach West Scotland, two.

Eclipse SchoolRun 

In 2006, Wrightbus launched the Eclipse SchoolRun; effectively an entirely high floor version of the Eclipse Commuter, bodied on Volvo B7R coach chassis. The Eclipse SchoolRun was mainly intended for school bus work. Northern Ireland bus operator Ulsterbus were the only customer to order the Eclipse SchoolRun, ordering 160 of the type in 2006. The first 110 were delivered with 66 seats in a high density 2+3 layout, including several removable seats at the front of the bus, which can be removed to allow the provision of wheelchair space; the final 50 buses were delivered with 62 seats and a permanent wheelchair area to save time in taking out and putting back the removable seats. The final Eclipse SchoolRun was completed in 2008.

Second generation (2008–2015) 

The second generation Wright Eclipse, known as the Eclipse Urban 2, was launched at the 2008 Euro Bus Expo as the successor to the Eclipse Urban, although the two designs were produced concurrently until 2011. The Eclipse 2 features front and rear ends facelifted to match the Wright StreetCar, and is now only available on Volvo B7RLE chassis.

With the launch of the Eclipse 2, the three other first generation Eclipse models – the Eclipse Commuter, Eclipse Metro and Eclipse SchoolRun – were withdrawn from the market, with no official successors.

Third generation (2015–2019) 
The third generation Eclipse, known as the Eclipse 3, was launched in 2015. The Eclipse 3 was only available on Volvo B8RLE chassis, the successor to the B7RLE. As well as the difference in chassis, the front and rear ends initially underwent a minor facelift, incorporating design features from the Wright StreetLite integral design. The first Eclipse 3s entered service with Trentbarton in November 2015 and the second batch by Stagecoach in the Fens for the Cambridgeshire Busway. The front design was revised further in spring 2017 with the first (and only) 13.2m examples being purchased by East Coast Buses.
The first 11.8m variant with the revised bodywork has since entered service with Delaine Buses.

References 

 Millar, Alan (2007) Bus & Coach Recognition: Ian Allan Ltd.,

External links 

Wright Eclipse Commuter at Wrightbus website
 Wright Eclipse SchoolRun at Wrightbus website

Low-floor buses
Vehicles introduced in 1999
Eclipse